The F.T. Barney was a 19th-century American schooner that sank in 1868. Her wreck in Lake Huron near Rogers City, Michigan, was listed on the National Register of Historic Places in 1991.

F.T. Barney was built in 1856 by William Cherry of Vermilion, Ohio, and was owned by Lewis Wells, also of Vermillion. In late 1857, she ran aground near Goderich, Ontario, but was successfully towed to Detroit, Michigan, for repairs.

Just after midnight on October 23, 1868, F.T. Barney was traveling from Cleveland to Milwaukee with a load of coal. In Lake Huron near Rogers City, Michigan, the F.T. Barney collided with the schooner T.J. Bronson. F.T. Barney sank in less than two minutes, but there were no deaths. Later investigation determined that both vessels were equally at fault.

The wreck remained undiscovered until 1987. The masts and deck equipment are still in place.

References

Shipwrecks on the National Register of Historic Places in Michigan
Great Lakes freighters
Maritime incidents in October 1868
Ships sunk in collisions
Shipwrecks of Lake Huron
1856 ships
Ships built in Ohio
National Register of Historic Places in Presque Isle County, Michigan